"Hands Up in the Air" is a song by Australian rock band Boom Crash Opera. It was released in 1986 as the second single from their self-titled studio album.

The song reached number 16 in Australia.

Track listing 
7" single (0.258620)
 Hands Up in the Air (Extended Remix) (Peter Farnan; Richard Pleasance, Dale Ryder) – 4:47
 Leave (Dale Ryder, Greg O'Connor, Peter Maslen) – 3:44
 Hands Up in the Air  (Peter Farnan; Richard Pleasance) – 3:47

Personnel 
 Peter Maslen – drums, vocals
 Greg O'Connor – keyboards
 Dale Ryder – lead vocals
 Richard Pleasance – guitar, bass, vocals
 Peter Farnan – guitar, vocals

Charts

Weekly charts

References

External links 
Hands Up In The Air @AllMusic
Boom Crash Opera – Hands Up In The Air (12" single)

1986 songs
1986 singles
Boom Crash Opera songs
Warner Music Group singles
Songs written by Richard Pleasance